Big Fork (also Bigfork) is an unincorporated community in eastern Polk County, Arkansas, United States. The community is approximately 17 miles southeast of Mena on Arkansas Route 8. Big Fork Creek flows past the east side of the community. The community of Abernathy Springs lies 1.5 miles to the southeast on Route 8.

References

Unincorporated communities in Polk County, Arkansas
Unincorporated communities in Arkansas